The knockout stage of the 2023 FIFA Women's World Cup will be the second and final stage of the competition, following the group stage. It will begin on 5 August with the round of 16 and end on 20 August with the final match, held at the Stadium Australia in Sydney. The top two teams from each group (sixteen in total) will advance to the knockout stage to compete in a single-elimination style tournament.

All times listed are local.

Format
In the knockout stage, if a match is level at the end of 90 minutes of normal playing time, extra time will be played (two periods of 15 minutes each), where each team is allowed to make a sixth substitution. If still tied after extra time, the match will be decided by a penalty shoot-out to determine the winner.

Qualified teams
The top two placed teams from each of the eight groups will qualify for the knockout stage.

Bracket

Round of 16

Winner Group A vs Runner-up Group C

Winner Group C vs Runner-up Group A

Winner Group E vs Runner-up Group G

Winner Group G vs Runner-up Group E

Winner Group D vs Runner-up Group B

Winner Group B vs Runner-up Group D

Winner Group H vs Runner-up Group F

Winner Group F vs Runner-up Group H

Quarter-finals

Winner match 49 vs Winner match 51

Winner match 50 vs Winner match 52

Winner match 53 vs Winner match 55

Winner match 54 vs Winner match 56

Semi-finals

Winner match 57 vs Winner match 58

Winner match 59 vs Winner match 60

Third place play-off

Final

References

External links
 

2023 FIFA Women's World Cup